Gryllotalpa brachyptera is a mole cricket, native to Australia (New South Wales and Sydney).

Notes

Further reading
Tindale, N.B. (1928). Australasian mole-crickets of the family Gryllotalpidae (Orthoptera).

Gryllotalpidae
Orthoptera of Australia
Insects described in 1928